The 1906 West Virginia Mountaineers football team was an American football team that represented West Virginia University as an independent during the 1906 college football season. In its second and final season under head coach Carl Forkum, the team compiled a 5–5 record and outscored opponents by a total of 192 to 74. Thomas Leahy was the team captain.

Schedule

References

West Virginia
West Virginia Mountaineers football seasons
West Virginia Mountaineers football